"Hope of Deliverance" is a song by English singer-songwriter Paul McCartney, released in December 1992 as the lead single from his ninth solo studio album, Off the Ground (1993). The rock and Latin song reached number 18 on the UK Singles Chart and became a top-five hit in Austria, Canada, Germany, Italy, Norway, and Switzerland. The song was recorded during sessions for Off the Ground, which took place on 17 July 1992. The overdub session is described in detail by Italian percussionist Maurizio Ravalico in the book Paul McCartney: Recording Sessions (1969–2013).

Critical reception
J.D. Considine from The Baltimore Sun complimented the "lilting, Latin cadences" of "Hope of Deliverance". Larry Flick from Billboard remarked that McCartney "continues to embrace warm and positive visions on this first glimpse into his upcoming Off the Ground collection." He explained, "A soft, acoustic-anchored arrangement clips along at a breezy pace. Spanish cultural influences and handclappin' rhythms gives the track a unique and refreshing vibe that will please programmers at pop, AC, and album-rock levels. Like a visit from a dear old friend." Randy Clark from Cashbox felt the single "is certainly not representative of the more brilliant musical work Paul has done over his 30-plus year career, although it's refreshing that he continues to enjoy the process." He added, "The intended inspiration of this track offers no solutions to "...the darkness that surrounds us", but it could be comforting for some to know Mr. Happy McMoneybags can still write a positive little pop song about anything."

A reviewer from Evening Herald noted the "uplifting pop panache" of the song. Irish Independent declared it as "simple, efficient pop". Liverpool Echo stated that it "sees Paul entering 1993 with optimism", adding further, "The single that grows and grows like most McCartney songs. It highlights his, optimistic side and his acoustic gift. It has flashbacks of the hit single "Goodnight Tonight"." In his weekly UK chart commentary, James Masterton described it as "a gentle acoustic ballad". Alan Jones from Music Week wrote, "A jangly guitar intro ushers in a double-tracked Macca on a quirky but ultimately undistinguished and rather corny track, with an insipid middle eight. McCartney last breached the Top 10 in 1987 and this, sadly, isn't the song to end his drought." Parker Puterbaugh from Rolling Stone said it is "one of those perfect little tunes McCartney plucks from his songwriter's subconscious like a pearl from a shell. Deceptively wispy, effortlessly catchy, it finds McCartney breezily proffering a positive attitude toward the days ahead".

Chart performance
"Hope of Deliverance" became a hit in McCartney's native UK, reaching number 18. It did not fare well on the US Billboard Hot 100, peaking at number 83, but it did better on the Billboard Adult Contemporary chart, reaching number nine, and in Canada, where it reached number five. It also did very well in Germany, peaking at number three. Remix versions were released on 15 January 1993, and picked up massive airplay in clubs.

Music video

The official music video for the song was directed by British director Andy Morahan. It received heavy rotation on MTV Europe.

Live performances
The song was featured in the set list of 1993's The New World Tour. It was in hiatus until McCartney performed it again in Bogotá, Colombia on 19 April 2012 during his On the Run Tour—the first time performing a song from Off the Ground with his 2012 lineup. During the Out There Tour, McCartney performed "Hope of Deliverance" with all musicians in his band playing guitar, including the tour opener in Belo Horizonte.

Track listings
 7-inch single
 "Hope of Deliverance" – 3:20
 "Long Leather Coat" (P. McCartney/L. McCartney) – 3:33

 CD maxi
 "Hope of Deliverance" – 3:20
 "Big Boys Bickering" – 3:19
 "Long Leather Coat" (P. McCartney/L. McCartney) – 3:33
 "Kicked Around No More" – 5:25

 Audio cassette
 "Hope of Deliverance" – 3:20
 "Long Leather Coat" (P. McCartney/L. McCartney) – 3:33

Personnel
 Paul McCartney: bass, guitar and vocals
 Linda McCartney: autoharp and backing vocals
 Hamish Stuart: backing vocals
 Robbie McIntosh: guitar
 Blair Cunningham: backing vocals and percussion
 Paul "Wix" Wickens: piano, LinnDrum, drum programming, percussion and backing vocals
 David Giovannini: percussion
 Dave Pattman: percussion
 Maurizio Ravalico: percussion

Charts and certifications

Weekly charts

Year-end charts

Certifications

References

 

1992 songs
1993 singles
Capitol Records singles
Paul McCartney songs
Music published by MPL Music Publishing
Music videos directed by Andy Morahan
Parlophone singles
Song recordings produced by Paul McCartney
Song recordings produced by Julian Mendelsohn
Songs written by Paul McCartney